Roman Mareš (born 15 March 1975), is a Czech futsal player who plays for Era-Pack Chrudim and the Czech Republic national futsal team.

References

External links
UEFA profile
Futsalplanet profile

1975 births
Living people
Czech men's futsal players
Sportspeople from Havlíčkův Brod